Joël Blomqvist (1840 - 1930) was a Swedish hymnwriter.

External links
 Blomqvist, Joël

1840 births
1930 deaths
Swedish Lutheran hymnwriters